The U.S. state of Texas first required its residents to register their motor vehicles in 1907. Registrants provided their own license plates for display, with serial numbers assigned by their county of residence, until the state began to issue plates in 1917.

, plates are issued by the Texas Department of Motor Vehicles (TxDMV). Front and rear plates are required for most classes of vehicles, while only rear plates are required for motorcycles, trailers and antique vehicles.

Texas plates are currently made at the Wynne Unit in Huntsville, Texas.

Passenger baseplates

1917 to 1974
The first Texas license plate that complied with these standards was a modification of the 1955 plate, introduced towards the end of that year.

1975 to present

Non-passenger plates

Temporary tags
Temporary tags are issued to unregistered vehicles and to vehicles registered in states that do not have a reciprocity agreement with Texas. These tags are printed on paper and are used mainly by dealers. , four types are available: three are valid for 72 hours, 144 hours, and 30 days respectively; the fourth is the "one-trip" tag, which is issued only to unladen vehicles traveling from a single origin to a single destination (either of which must be in Texas) and is valid for 15 days.

In February 2022, it was reported that as many as 1.2 million fraudulent temporary Texas tags were sold in the United States in 2021. Due to inadequate security standards in the dealer application process in Texas, fraudulent individuals posing as dealers could purchase licenses for less than $800. This gave them access to the Texas DMV database, which they could use to print temporary tags and sell them online for profit. Most drivers who purchased the tags did so to make their vehicles untraceable when committing crimes, or to avoid paying tolls and registration fees.

Optional plates
Texas has more specialty plates than any other state, with 506 available.

References

Further reading
 An extensive history and catalog of Texas license plates.

External links
Texas license plates, 1969–present

Texas
Texas transportation-related lists
Transportation in Texas